Bouaké Department is a department of Gbêkê Region in Vallée du Bandama District, Ivory Coast. In 2021, its population was 931,851 making it the second most populous department in the country behind Abidjan. The seat of the department is the city of Bouaké. The sub-prefectures of the department are Bouaké-SP, Bouaké-Ville, Bounda, Brobo, Mamini, and N'Djébonouan.

History

Bouaké Department was created in 1969 as one of the 24 new departments that were created to take the place of the six departments that were being abolished. It was created from territory that was formerly part of Centre Department. Using current boundaries as a reference, from 1969 to 1988 the department occupied the following territory: all of Gbêkê Region; all of Bélier Region; all of Yamoussoukro Autonomous District; and all of Iffou Region, with the exception of Daoukro Department.

In 1988, Bouaké Department was split into six parts to create five new departments: Béoumi, M'Bahiakro, Sakassou, Toumodi, and Yamoussoukro.

In 1997, regions were introduced as new first-level subdivisions of Ivory Coast; as a result, all departments were converted into second-level subdivisions. Bouaké Department was included as part of Vallée du Bandama Region.

Bouaké Department was split again in 2008 to create Botro Department.

In 2011, districts were introduced as new first-level subdivisions of Ivory Coast. At the same time, regions were reorganised and became second-level subdivisions and all departments were converted into third-level subdivisions. At this time, Bouaké Department became part of Gbêkê Region in Vallée du Bandama District.

Notes

Departments of Gbêkê
1969 establishments in Ivory Coast
States and territories established in 1969